Redesdale  is a town in central Victoria, Australia. It is located partly in the City of Greater Bendigo local government area and partly in the Shire of Mount Alexander.

History
The Post Office opened on 22 March 1865.

Redesdale bridge

Redesdale is on the opposite bank of the Campaspe River from the town of Mia Mia.  The towns are connected by the heritage listed Redesdale bridge,
one of the oldest iron lattice-truss bridges in Victoria.  The trusses for the bridge were originally imported for a river crossing in suburban Hawthorn in 1859. The ship Herald of the Morning bringing the trusses to Melbourne caught fire and sank in Hobsons Bay. As a result, the Hawthorn Bridge, connecting Richmond and Hawthorn, was delayed for a couple of years while new trusses were made and shipped out to Australia.

Ten years later the original trusses were salvaged from the Herald of the Morning and used for the Redesdale Bridge. The bridge was constructed on site in 1868 with a divided-lane through-truss design created specifically for the difficult river crossing and unique in Victoria.

Railway
Redesdale was once the terminus for a branch line railway which connected with the Melbourne - Murray River Railway at Redesdale Junction, between Kyneton and Malmsbury. Other stopping points on the line, going towards Redesdale, included Edgecombe, Green Hill, East Metcalfe, Emberton and Barfold. The Redesdale line was opened on 15 January 1891 and closed on 29 June 1954. The tracks and stations have since been removed.

Other
Redesdale is currently home to a primary school, a petrol station/general store, a historic bluestone pub/tavern and the Rural café.

Australia's worst aircraft disaster occurred two miles east of town. see 1945 Australian National Airways Stinson crash

References

Towns in Victoria (Australia)
Bendigo
Suburbs of Bendigo